Ohio State Route 176 (SR 176) is a route linking Interstate 71 (I-71) in Cleveland to I-77 near Richfield. The freeway portion is known as the Jennings Freeway, while the at-grade portion is mostly Broadview Road.

Route description

From its southern terminus at I-77 to SR 17, SR 176 has at-grade intersections. SR 176's route from SR 17 (Brookpark Road) to I-71 is a limited-access highway. From 1968, it functioned as an exit off of I-71 and side streets, terminating at Denison Road and serving businesses in the industrial valley. As traffic volumes to suburbs such as Parma and Parma Heights increased – and to relieve traffic from I-77 to I-480 – the freeway portion of the route (known as the Jennings Freeway) was extended as originally planned to I-480 and Brookpark Road (SR 17), opening December 8, 1998.

History
Soon after its creation, SR 176 was extended to Akron, routed with U.S. Route 21 (US 21; here part of Cleveland-Massillon Road), over SR 92 (Ghent Road), replacing it, and along Market Street with a portion SR 18 (at the time, SR 18 followed Twin Oaks Road from Market Street) to downtown Akron, ending at the High Street/Broadway Street couplet (then SR 5, 8, and 261, now just SR 261). After the completion of I-77, SR 176 was relocated along Wheatley Road and moved on to I-77 from exits 143 to 138, before rejoining its original alignment. In the early 1970s, US 21 was changed to SR 21 at that location, and SR 176 was truncated at I-77 exit 143. SR 18 was also truncated, but realigned to follow the entirety of Market Street (which had also carried the also-truncated SR 8 east of High and Broadway) to end at SR 91.

Major intersections

Route 176J

Route 176J was the section of Broadview Road between Brookpark Road (SR 17) in Parma and Pearl Road (U.S. Route 42) in the Old Brooklyn neighborhood of Cleveland, which formerly carried SR 176. Since the relocation of SR 176 onto the Jennings Freeway in 1998, this roadway was intended to be turned over from the state system to the local government ("J" suffix meaning "awaiting abandonment"). The road was kept under state maintenance until it was turned over to the city of Cleveland between 2015 and 2017.

References

External links

Roadfan.com's Jennings Freeway page

176
Cleveland area expressways
Transportation in Summit County, Ohio
Transportation in Cuyahoga County, Ohio